The 1995–96 Biathlon World Cup was a multi-race tournament over a season of biathlon, organised by the International Biathlon Union. The season started on 7 December 1995 in Östersund, Sweden, and ended on 17 March 1996 in Hochfilzen, Austria. It was the 19th season of the Biathlon World Cup.

Calendar
Below is the IBU World Cup calendar for the 1995–96 season.

World Cup Podium

Men

Women

Men's team

Women's team

Standings: Men

Overall 

Final standings after 14 races.

Individual 

Final standings after 7 races.

Sprint 

Final standings after 7 races.

Nation 

Final standings after 20 races.

Standings: Women

Overall 

Final standings after 14 races.

Individual 

Final standings after 7 races.

Sprint 

Final standings after 7 races.

Nation 

Final standings after 20 races.

Medal table

Achievements
Victory in this World Cup (all-time number of victories in parentheses)

Men
 , 5 (6) first places
 , 2 (5) first places
 , 2 (4) first places
 , 1 (3) first place
 , 1 (3) first place
 , 1 (2) first place
 , 1 (1) first place
 , 1 (1) first place

Women
 , 4 (8) first places
 , 2 (3) first places
 , 1 (8) first place
 , 1 (2) first place
 , 1 (2) first place
 , 1 (2) first place
 , 1 (1) first place
 , 1 (1) first place
 , 1 (1) first place
 , 1 (1) first place

Retirements
Following notable biathletes retired during or after the 1995–96 season:

References

External links
IBU official site

Biathlon World Cup
1995 in biathlon
1996 in biathlon